Kerry E. Sieh is an American geologist and seismologist.

Sieh's principal research interest is earthquake geology, which uses geological layers and landforms to understand the geometries of active faults, the earthquakes they generate, and the crustal structure their movements produce. His early work on the San Andreas fault led to the discovery of how often and how regularly it produces large earthquakes in southern California.

Sieh received his undergraduate degree in geology from the University of California, Riverside in 1972 and his Ph.D. degree in geology from Stanford University in 1977. He was a professor of geology at the California Institute of Technology from 1986 to 2009. Soon after joining Caltech, Sieh was recognized by the Los Angeles Times as a "Rising Star" in Southern California in 1988. Sieh is a member of the United States National Academy of Sciences (since 1999).

In 2009, Sieh became the director of Nanyang Technological University's Earth Observatory. He is the first holder of the AXA-NTU Chair on Natural Hazards in Southeast Asia established in 2012.

Awards and honors

 Harry Fielding Reid Medal, 2014 
 LGBTQ Scientist of the Year Award, National Organization of Gay and Lesbian Scientists and Technical Professionals, 2006
 Fellow, American Geophysical Union, 2001
 National Academy of Sciences, member, 1999
 Fellow, Geological Society of America, 1996
 National Academy of Sciences Award for Initiatives in Research, 1982
 E.B. Burwell, Jr., Memorial Award of the Engineering Geology Division, Geological Society of America, 1980

Publications
 "Geology of Earthquakes" with Robert S. Yeats and Clarence R. Allen. Oxford University Press (1997) 
 "The Earth in Turmoil: Earthquakes and Volcanos and Their Impact on Humankind" with Simon LeVay. W. H. Freeman & Sons (1998) 
 "Living on an Active Earth: Perspectives on Earthquake Science" as part of the Committee on the Science of Earthquakes, National Research Council. National Academies Press (2003)

References

Living people
American geologists
California Institute of Technology faculty
Members of the United States National Academy of Sciences
Stanford University alumni
American seismologists
American LGBT scientists
Fellows of the Geological Society of America
Fellows of the American Geophysical Union
Year of birth missing (living people)